Ricky Anggawijaya is an Indonesian swimmer from Bandung who specializes in backstroke. However, his first medal in Southeast Asian Games is a silver medal from the 5000 m open water swimming event. He also won another silver in the same discipline, this time in 10000 m distance. In 2012 Pekan Olahraga Nasional, Ricky won a gold medal in 1500 m freestyle for West Java.

He also competed in the 2013 Asian Youth Games, hosted by Nanjing, China. Competing in three events, he won gold in 100 m backstroke and silver in 200 m backstroke. In his second participation at the Southeast Asian Games, he won gold in 200 m backstroke. He also won two bronze medals, one in 100 m backstroke, and the other in 4 x 200 metre freestyle relay with his fellow Indonesian swimmers.

References 

1996 births
Living people
Indonesian people of Chinese descent
Indonesian male swimmers
Male backstroke swimmers
Sportspeople from Bandung
Swimmers at the 2014 Asian Games
Swimmers at the 2018 Asian Games
Swimmers at the 2014 Summer Youth Olympics
Southeast Asian Games medalists in swimming
Southeast Asian Games gold medalists for Indonesia
Southeast Asian Games silver medalists for Indonesia
Southeast Asian Games bronze medalists for Indonesia
Competitors at the 2011 Southeast Asian Games
Competitors at the 2013 Southeast Asian Games
Competitors at the 2015 Southeast Asian Games
Competitors at the 2017 Southeast Asian Games
Asian Games competitors for Indonesia
Indonesian male freestyle swimmers
21st-century Indonesian people